Washington State University Vancouver also known as WSU Vancouver is a campus of Washington State University. WSU Vancouver is located on a  campus outside of  Vancouver, Washington, approximately eight miles (13 km) north of the Columbia River and 17 miles north of downtown Portland, Oregon.  Degrees offered by WSU Vancouver are conferred by Washington State University.  WSU is the only "Research I" (RU/VH) institution in the Portland-Vancouver metropolitan area, based on the Carnegie Classification of Institutions of Higher Education.  Previously an undergraduate transfer college, WSU Vancouver expanded to a full four-year university in 2006.

History 
Washington State University began offering courses in Southwest Washington in 1983 as part of the Southwest Washington Joint Center for Education. In 1989, the University in Pullman formally established Washington State University Vancouver as a branch campus of the state's land-grant institution. The current Salmon Creek campus opened in 1996. In Fall 2006, WSU Vancouver admitted freshmen and sophomores for the first time and began offering lower-division courses.

Campus resources 
The  campus has many computing and research laboratories, including student computing labs, fabrication labs, science research labs, group instruction labs, fine arts labs, a circuits and microprocessors lab, computer-aided drafting lab and a writing center. The science resources and instrumentation possessed by the campus consist of GC/MS, HPLC (UVvis), DNA sequencer, TOC/N, RT-PCR, Flame ionization detector, two Phantom cameras, a scanning electron microscope, an Instron tensile tester, and a confocal microscope, along with a fully functional cleanroom.

WSU Vancouver's library has more than 800 journals in hardcopy and over 9,000 full-text online journals and newspapers, a core collection of more than 30,000 books and access to more than 100 major bibliographic databases. The library participates in several local and regional library consortia, including the Portland Area Library System and ORBIS/CASCADE (the Oregon and Washington Cooperative Library Project). It also houses the Environmental Information Cooperative Library.

Academic programs 
WSU Vancouver offers bachelor's degrees, master's degrees, and doctorate degrees in more than 40 fields of study. Students may also be enrolled in science graduate study programs in the School of Biological Sciences in Pullman and pursue their entire degree at WSU Vancouver; greatly enhancing the number of degrees available at the master's and doctoral level by proxy.

Research Labs 
The School of Engineering and Computer Science at WSU Vancouver operates several research laboratories, including the Nanomaterials-Sensor Laboratory, Wireless Circuit and System Research Lab, Computer Aided Engineering Lab, Electric Power Systems Lab, Robotics and Automation Lab, 
Radio Frequency (RF) Research Laboratory, Advanced Materials and Manufacturing Lab, Micro-Nano-Bio Systems Lab, Electrochemical Engineering Lab, Fluid Dynamics Lab, 
Interfacial Fluid Dynamics Lab, Parallel and Distributed Data Management Systems Lab, Distributed Systems Research Lab. Usually faculties receive funding from government agencies, and local companies. There also many research labs in the department of Environmental Science, Biology, Mathematics, Neuroscience.

Students
The opening of the Firstenburg Student Commons (FSC) in the Fall of 2007 marked a change in student life on the Vancouver campus.

Although there is currently no on-campus housing, WSU Vancouver offers many activities and events for students. For example, there are many student-run organizations such as a History Club, Cougar Pride LGBT club and KOUG radio. KOUG Radio is a student-run radio station that occasionally features radio shows broadcast by DJs, most of whom are students at the university. Another student-run organization is the Salmon Creek Journal, a visual arts and literary magazine created by students, alumni and faculty.

 Enrollment (Fall 2020): 3,504 students
 Average age(s) of student: 33–36
 Female: 55%
 Male: 45%
 6% of students are veterans
 45% first generation students
 31% students of color
 1:14 faculty:student ratio

Alumni 
A total of 17,228 graduates have completed study at WSU Vancouver. Roughly 92 percent of alumni remain in the area. As the campus is located close to many industrial and tech corporations, most of the WSU Vancouver alumni works in nearby companies located in Washington, Oregon, and California.

Popular culture 
In the novel Fifty Shades of Grey, the main character, Anastasia Steele, attends and graduates from WSU Vancouver. In response to this association, Avantika Bawa, a professor of Fine Arts at WSU Vancouver curated a 2013 show of student work titled 'Better Shades of Grey'.

See also
 Firstenburg Family Fountain

References

External links
 WSU Vancouver website

Buildings and structures in Vancouver, Washington
Education in Clark County, Washington
Education in Vancouver, Washington
Educational institutions established in 1989
Tourist attractions in Clark County, Washington
Public universities and colleges in Washington (state)
Washington State University
1989 establishments in Washington (state)